Navajo Blues is a 1996 American crime-action film produced and directed  by Joey Travolta and starring  Steven Bauer, Irene Bedard and Charlotte Lewis.

Plot
A Las Vegas police detective hides out from the Mafia on a Navajo reservation overrun by ritualistic murders.

Cast 
  Steven Bauer as  Nick Epps / John Cole
  Irene Bedard as  Audrey Wyako
  Charlotte Lewis as  Elizabeth Wyako
  Barry Donaldson as  Robert
  Ed O'Ross as  Not Lightning Struck
  George Yager as  Stevens
  Tom Fridley as  Toby Jr.
  Jack Bannon as  Captain Hansen
  Michael Horse as  Begay
   Billy Daydoge as  Grandfather Wyako
  Israel Gonzales  as  John
  Heather Black as  Amy
  Kenneth McCabe  as  Kincaid
  Addison Randall as  Quimbly

References

External links 
 

1990s crime action films
American crime action films
Films about Native Americans
Films set in the Las Vegas Valley
Films about the American Mafia
1990s English-language films
1990s American films